Louise Charbonneau may refer to 

Louise Charbonneau (politician), Member of Parliament of Canada
Louise Charbonneau (judge), judge in Canada